Patrick Kruger (born 3 February 1995) is a South African cricketer. He was included in the Griqualand West cricket team squad for the 2015 Africa T20 Cup.

In May 2017, Kruger was named Africa T20 Cup Player of the Tournament at Cricket South Africa's annual awards. In August 2017, he was named in Jo'burg Giants' squad for the first season of the T20 Global League. However, in October 2017, Cricket South Africa initially postponed the tournament until November 2018, with it being cancelled soon after.

In January 2018, Kruger scored his first century in List A cricket, batting for Knights against Cape Cobras in the 2017–18 Momentum One Day Cup. In September 2018, he was named in Northern Cape's squad for the 2018 Africa T20 Cup. He was the leading run-scorer for Northern Cape in the tournament, with 200 runs in four matches.

In October 2018, Kruger was named in Paarl Rocks' squad for the first edition of the Mzansi Super League T20 tournament. In September 2019, he was named in Northern Cape's squad for the 2019–20 CSA Provincial T20 Cup. In April 2021, he was named in Free State's squad, ahead of the 2021–22 cricket season in South Africa.

References

External links
 

1995 births
Living people
South African cricketers
Griqualand West cricketers
Northern Cape cricketers
Cricketers from Kimberley, Northern Cape
Paarl Rocks cricketers
Free State cricketers